Gabrielle Scollay (born 6 April 1989) is an Australian actress known for the role of Amy in the second season of the television series Blue Water High. She has been involved in many successful film and television projects including Dangerous (2007), Home and Away (2007), A Model Daughter: The Killing of Caroline Byrne (2009), Rescue: Special Ops (2011), and Dance Academy (2012). Gabrielle resides in Sydney Australia.

Filmography
Urthboy "Knee Length Socks" Music Video (2012)
Dance Academy as Lexie (2012)
Rescue: Special Ops as Kate Marchelo (2011)
A Model Daughter – The Killing of Caroline Byrne as Deanna Byrne (2009)
Home and Away as Tamsyn Armstrong (2007)
Dangerous as Catriona (6 episodes, 2007)
Blue Water High as Amy (26 episodes, 2006)

References

External links
 
 
 Showcast Profile
 Mark Morrissey & Associates (Acting Agent)
 

1989 births
Living people
Australian television actresses